Omm ol Azam (also Romanized as Omm ol ʿAẓām) is a village in Veys Rural District, Veys District, Bavi County, Khuzestan Province, Iran. At the 2006 census, its population was 13, in 4 families.

References 

Populated places in Bavi County